Akbarabad (also Romanized as Akbarābād; also known as Boyok Āqālū and Boyūk Āqā) is a village in Azadlu Rural District, Muran District, Germi County, Ardabil Province, Iran. At the 2006 census, its population was 189, in 36 families.

References

External links
Akbarabad on Tageo.com

Towns and villages in Germi County